Keith Hills Country Club is a residential golf course community located in Buies Creek, North Carolina and maintained by Campbell University.  Keith Hills features one par 72 courses:  Keith Hills I and II.  No. 1, completed in 1973, is 6,703 yards along the Cape Fear River and was designed by Ellis Maples while No. 2, completed in 2002, was designed by Dan Maples and features 6,888 yards.  No. 1 has been rated four stars by Golf Digest.

Keith Hills has been the site of the 1999 and 2004 Atlantic Sun Conference Men's Golf Tournaments as well as the 2004 and 2007 Atlantic Sun Conference Women's Tournaments.  Keith Hills is also the home to Campbell University's Professional Golf Management Program.

Notes

External links 
Keith Hills official site
Campbell University Professional Golf Management Program

Golf clubs and courses in North Carolina
Campbell University
College golf clubs and courses in the United States
Sports venues in Harnett County, North Carolina